Soñar no cuesta nada may refer to:

Soñar no Cuesta Nada, a telenovela
Soñar no Cuesta Nada (album), by Cuban singer Isabella Castillo
Soñar no cuesta nada (film), a 1941 Argentine film